Kassandra Ndoutou Eboa Missipo (born 3 February 1998) is a Belgian footballer who plays as a midfielder for Swiss Women's Super League club FC Basel the Belgium women's national team.

Career
Missipo has been capped for the Belgium national team, appearing for the team during the 2019 FIFA Women's World Cup qualifying cycle.

Personal life
Missipo is of Cameroonian descent and openly lesbian.

References

External links
 
 
 
 

1998 births
Living people
Belgian women's footballers
Belgium women's youth international footballers
Belgium women's international footballers
Belgian expatriate sportspeople in Switzerland
Black Belgian sportspeople
Women's association football midfielders
Belgian people of Cameroonian descent
Footballers from Flemish Brabant
People from Asse
Lesbian sportswomen
LGBT association football players
Belgium LGBT sportspeople
K.A.A. Gent (women) players
RSC Anderlecht (women) players
UEFA Women's Euro 2022 players
21st-century LGBT people
Expatriate women's footballers in Switzerland
Belgian expatriate women's footballers